Dana Kayonu is a 2016 Indian Kannada romantic comedy film directed and written by Yogaraj Bhat. The film stars Duniya Vijay and Priyamani. The film's music is scored by V. Harikrishna and the cinematography is by Sugnan. The film was released on 7 October 2016 clashing with Prakash Raj's directorial Idolle Ramayana which also featured Priyamani in the lead role.

Cast
 Duniya Vijay as Kempu aka Docomo
 Priyamani as Jummi 
 Rangayana Raghu as Subsidy 
 Suchendra Prasad 
 Vijanath Biradar as Krishnappa 
 Mahesh 
 Yogi
 Veena Sundar
 Jahangir 
 Nataša Stanković as an item number

Production
The official launch of the film took place at Rajajinagar, Bangalore on 9 June 2015. Celebrity actors such as  Shivarajkumar and V. Ravichandran were present during the launch. However, the very next day of the launch, the film met with trouble for its title. As reported, a particular community members objected for the title and termed it as an offense to their religion.

Soundtrack

The film's soundtrack and original score is composed by V. Harikrishna for which the lyrics is penned by Yogaraj Bhat. The audio released officially at Kanakapura in presence of Karnataka Power Minister, D. K. Shivakumar.

Track listing

Reception 
A critic from The New Indian Express wrote that "While the film’s first half mostly captures love between the hero and the heroine and also between the bull and cow, the second half strikes an emotional chord. Yogaraj Bhat has brought the man-animal camaraderie that only endears Dana Kayonu to us".

References

External links
 

2016 romantic comedy films
2010s Kannada-language films
2016 films
Films directed by Yogaraj Bhat
Films scored by V. Harikrishna